Irish independence may refer to:
Irish Home Rule movement, from 1870 to 1921
1916 Proclamation of the Irish Republic
Irish War of Independence, 1919–1921, a guerrilla war fought between the Irish Republican Army, under the Irish Republic, and the United Kingdom
1921 Anglo-Irish Treaty, the treaty that brought the Irish War of Independence to a close
Irish Free State, the state that seceded from the United Kingdom in 1922 following the Anglo-Irish Treaty of 1921
 Republic of Ireland Act 1948

See also 
Irish Independent, a newspaper 
Irish nationalism
Irish republicanism
United Ireland